Siah Piran-e Kasmai (also Romanized as Sīāh Pīrān-e Kasmā’ī; also known as Shālgā and Shālkā) is a village in Lulaman Rural District, in the Central District of Fuman County, Gilan Province, Iran. At the 2006 census, its population was 212, in 61 families.

References 

Populated places in Fuman County